Dạ cổ hoài lang ("Night Drum Beats Cause Longing for Absent Husband", Chữ Hán: 夜鼓怀郎) is a Vietnamese song, composed circa 1918 by songwriter Cao Văn Lầu, colloquially known as "ông Sáu Lầu," from Bạc Liêu. It was a massive hit across Vietnam in 1927 as it was taken up by travelling troupes and spawned many variants, versions and imitators.

The song "Dạ cổ hoài lang" was the first song in what became known as the defining vọng cổ ("longing") melody of the nhạc tài tử ("amateur music") genre of cai luong ("reformed") music that for many people ông Sáu Lầu's "Dạ cổ hoài lang" is vọng cổ.

Lyrics

Từ là từ phu tướng
Báu kiếm sắc phán lên đàng
Vào ra luống trông tin nhạn
Năm canh mơ màng
Em luống trông tin chàng
Ôi gan vàng thêm đau.
Đường dầu sa ong bướm
Xin đó đừng phụ nghĩa tào khang
Đêm luống trông tin bạn
Ngày mỏi mòn như đá Vọng phu
Vọng - phu vọng luống trông tin chàng
Lòng xin chớ phụ phàng
Chàng là chàng có hay
Đêm thiếp nằm luống những sầu tây
Bao thuở đó đây sum vầy
Duyên sắt cầm đừng lợt phai
Là nguyện cho chàng
Hai chữ an - bình an
Trở lại gia đàng
Cho én nhạn hiệp đôi.

Literally in English :
“Since saying farewell to my husband - an army general,
When thou wast given the precious sharp sword to go to the front.
I have been walking in and out hoping for a dove swallow to appear,
Dreamy through the night.
I am longing for any news about thee - my husband,
Feeling more painful in the golden liver.
Although the road is full of bees and butterflies, 
Please do not subjugate thy health.
The night looks to believe in thee,
Every day I stand wearily like "Husband Longing" mound.
Hope in thee, and hope to keep trusting thee,
Please do not become subordinate.
Thou art a good young man,
Night and night I lay down in my sorrow.
How long ago since we were happily united,
Dependent on love, please don't fade.
All I pray for thee,
Is giving the word "Safety"
And I'll see thee soon in our family
Let the swallows and terns be united.”

Prelude
This is usually preceded and interspersed by recitative, this is the beginning of the tân cổ version from folk composer :vi:Viễn Châu (1924)
Mấy cánh mai vàng gởi... gió... xuân
Đường xa đã mỏi gót phong trần
Bâng khuâng dạo bản đàn năm cũ
Một chút ân tình gởi... cố... nhân

Several yellow orchid branches I sent... through the spring... breeze
The road was too long that worn the heels of the weathered man
Marveling I play old year melody
A little love sent... to my old... flame.

References

External links
 Original Lyrics in Vietnamese
 tân cổ version by Viễn Châu

Vietnamese songs
1919 songs